PTE or Pte may refer to:

Organizations
 Workers' Party of Ecuador, the Partido de los Trabajadores de Ecuador
 Party of Labour of Spain, the Partido del Trabajo de España
 Passenger transport executive, a local government body responsible for public transport in the United Kingdom
 Prairie Theatre Exchange, a theatre in Winnipeg, Manitoba, Canada
 Private Training Establishment, a category of tertiary education organisations in New Zealand
 University of Pécs (Pécsi Tudományegyetem), Hungary

Science and technology
 Periodic table of elements
 Phosphotriesterase, an enzyme
 PicturesToExe, slideshow software
 Post-traumatic epilepsy, recurrent seizures that result from head trauma
 Power Tab Editor, guitar tablature software
 Pressure-tolerant electronics, components that operate satisfactorily under high pressure, such as in submarines
 Page table entry, the OS's mapping of virtual address to physical address in a page table
 Phantom Transfer Engine, software used with the Spirit DataCine
 CVH-PTE Engine, a Ford CVH engine
 Performance testing environment, in a performance test

Other uses
 Pearson Test of English, several of the Pearson Language Tests
 Portuguese escudo, the former official currency of Portugal
 Private (rank), a military rank
 Permission to enter
 Proprietary company in Singapore